At the 2011 Census, Bihar was the third most populous state of India with total population of 104,099,452, nearly 89% of it rural. It was also India's most densely populated state, with 1,106 persons per square kilometre.  The sex ratio was 918 females per 1000 males. Almost 58% of Bihar's population was below 25 years age, which is the highest in India. At 11.3%, Bihar has the second-lowest urbanisation rate in India after Himachal Pradesh.

Most of Bihar's population belongs to a collection of ethnic groups speaking indic languages. It also attracted Punjabi Hindu refugees during the Partition of British India in 1947. Bihar has a total literacy rate of 63.82% (73.39% for males and 53.33% for females), recording a growth of 20% in female literacy over the preceding decade. According to the 2011 census, 82.7% of Bihar's population practised Hinduism, while 16.9% followed Islam. Bihar has highest fertility rate of 3.41 in comparison to the other states of India.

Population

Religion

Caste and ethnic groups

 As per, 2011 Census of India , Scheduled Castes constitute  16% of Bihar's 104 million population. The census identified 21 of 23 Dalit sub-castes as Mahadalits. Mahadalit community consists of the following sub castes - Bantar, Bauri, Bhogta, Bhuiya, Chaupal, Dabgar, Dom (Dhangad), Ghasi, Halalkhor, Hari (Mehtar, Bhangi), Kanjar, Kurariar, Lalbegi, Musahar, Nat, Pan (Swasi), Rajwar, Turi, Dhobi, Pasi, Chamar and Paswan (Dusadh). Paswan caste was initially left out of the Mahadalit category. Adivasis (Scheduled Tribes) constitute around 1.3% of Bihar population. Tribals include Gond, Santhal and Tharu communities in Bihar.
 Extremely Backward Class (EBCs) are also sometimes referred to as Most Backward Class(MBCs). There are 130-odd EBC castes in Bihar.

Languages

Hindi and Urdu are the official languages of the state, whilst the majority of the people speak one of the Bihari languages  – Bhojpuri, Magadhi, Maithili or Angika. Maithili is also one of the recognised regional languages of India as per the Eighth Schedule of the Constitution of India. Proponents have called Bhojpuri, Magahi, Bajjika and Angika to receive the same status.

Education

Bihar has a total literacy rate of 69.83%. Overall Male and Female literacy rate is 70.32% and 53.57% respectively. Total Rural literacy rate is 43.9%. In rural areas of Bihar, Male and Female literacy rate is 57.1 and 29.6 respectively. Total Urban literacy rate is 71.9.  In urban areas of Bihar, Male and Female literacy rate is 79.9 and 62.6 respectively.
.
Total number of literates in Bihar is 3,16,75,607 which consists 2,09,78,955 Male and 1,06,96,652 Female.
Patna has highest Literacy Rate of 63.82% followed by Rohtas	(62.36%) and Munger	(60.11%).
Kishanganj has lowest Literacy Rate of 31.02% followed by Araria (34.94%) and Katihar (35.29%).

Economics

Districts

Miscellaneous statistics
, Bihar had 212,015 international migrants and 1,619,031 inter-state migrants.

See also

Bihar caste-based survey 2023
Demographics of India
Demographics of Asia

References
Notes

Citations

Bihar
Bihar